Live in Paris 05 is a live album and video album highlighting Italian singer Laura Pausini's World Tour '05 performance at Paris' Le Zénith in March 2005. The album was released by Warner Music in November 2005 in CD, DVD, CD+DVD and two-disc DVD editions.

Track listing

Charts

References 

Laura Pausini live albums
2005 live albums
2005 video albums
Live video albums